Cyrene, minor planet designation 133 Cyrene, is a fairly large and very bright main-belt asteroid that was discovered by J. C. Watson on 16 August 1873 in Ann Arbor, Michigan, and named after Cyrene, a nymph, daughter of king Hypseus and beloved of Apollo in Greek mythology. It is classified as an S-type asteroid based upon its spectrum. It is listed as a member of the Hecuba group of asteroids that orbit near the 2:1 mean-motion resonance with Jupiter.

In the Tholen classification system, it is categorized as a stony SR-type asteroid. Photometric observations of this asteroid at the Altimira Observatory in 1985 gave a light curve with a period of 12.707 ± 0.015 hours and a brightness variation of 0.22 in magnitude. This result matches previous measurements reported in 1984 and 2005.

References

External links
 
 

Background asteroids
Cyrene
Cyrene
SR-type asteroids (Tholen)
S-type asteroids (SMASS)
18730816